Kirsty or Kirstie is a feminine given name and nickname.

It is a Scottish diminutive of Christine in English-speaking countries and is also linked to Kirsten — the Scandinavian version of Christine.

People
 Kirstie Alley (1951–2022), American actress
 Kirstie Allsopp (born 1971), British TV presenter
 Kirsty Bentley (1983–1998), New Zealand murder victim
 Kirsty Bertarelli (born Kirsty Roper in 1971), songwriter, former Miss UK
 Kirsty Blackman (born 1986), Scottish politician, SNP Member of Parliament for Aberdeen North (2015-present)
 Kirstie Clements (born 1962), Australian author, editor, journalist and speaker, former Editor-in-Chief of Vogue Australia
 Kirsty Coventry (born 1983), Zimbabwean swimmer
 Kirsty Dillon (born 1976), English actress 
 Kirsty Duncan (born 1966), Canadian politician and medical geographer
 Kirsty Gallacher (born 1976), Scottish television presenter
 Kirsty Gilmour (born 1993), Scottish badminton player
 Kirsty Hawkshaw (born 1969), English electronic music singer and songwriter
 Kirsty Howard (1995–2015), English woman born with a rare medical condition who raised millions for charity
 Kirsty Hume (born 1976), Scottish model
 Kirsty Jones (died 2000), British female murder victim
 Kirsty Jones, Welsh professional kitesurfer
 Kirsty Lang (born 1962), British journalist and broadcaster
 Kirstie Levell (born 1997), English football goalkeeper
 Kirsty MacColl (1959–2000), English singer-songwriter
 Kirstin Maldonado (born 1992), American singer-songwriter, a member of the a cappella group Pentatonix
 Kirsty Penkman, British biomolecular archaeologist
 Kirsty-Leigh Porter (born 1988), English actress
 Kirsty Wade (born 1962), British former middle-distance runner
 Kirsty Wark (born 1955), Scottish journalist and television presenter
 Kirsty Young (born 1968), Scottish television and radio presenter

Fictional characters
 Kirsty (Hellraiser), in the Hellraiser movie and book franchise
 Kirsty Branning, from the British soap opera EastEnders
 Kirsty Knight (Shortland Street), from the New Zealand soap opera Shortland Street
 Kirsty McGurk, from the Welsh-language soap opera Pobol y Cwm
 Kirsty Millar, from the British soap opera Doctors
 Kirsty Miller, from the British radio soap opera The Archers
 Kirsty Soames, from the British soap opera Coronation Street
 Kirsty Sutherland, from the Australian soap opera Home and Away

See also
All pages beginning with Kirsty
All pages beginning with Kirstie
Kersti, a given name
Kirsti
Kirsteen

References

English-language feminine given names
Feminine given names
Scottish feminine given names
Hypocorisms